The following are the national records in athletics in Greece maintained by Greece's national athletics federation: Hellenic Amateur Athletic Association(SEGAS).

Outdoor

Key to tables:

+ = en route to a longer distance

h = hand timing

X = not recognised because of doping violation

Men

Women

Indoor

Men

Women

Notes

References
General
Greek Records  24 July 2022 updated
Specific

External links
SEGAS web site 

Greece
Records
Athletics
Athletics